Helcio is a given name. It may refer to:

 Hélcio (footballer) (1903-unknown), Hélcio de Paiva, Brazilian footballer
 Hélcio da Silva (born 1928), Brazilian pole vaulter
 Hélcio Milito (1931-2014), Brazilian jazz musician and drummer